Moschochori is a village in Phthiotis, Greece. Since the 2011 local government reform it is part of the municipality of Lamia, and of the municipal unit of Gorgopotamos. It had a population of 822 in the 2011 census.

References

Populated places in Phthiotis